The 2016–17 CERH European League was the 52nd season of Europe's premier club roller hockey tournament organised by CERH, and the 20th season since it was renamed from European Champion Clubs' Cup to the CERH Champions League/European League.

The winners of the 2016–17 CERH European League earn the right to play against the winners of the 2016–17 CERS Cup in the 2017 CERH Continental Cup.

Benfica were the defending champions.

Teams
League positions of the previous season shown in parentheses (TH: Title holders, LQF: Losing quarter-finalists). Bold means seeded teams.

 There was a berth for the winner of the National Roller Hockey League (from England), but the champions King's Lynn declined the invitation. The losing quarter-finalists of the Lega Nazionale Hockey, Bassano, were then awarded with the spot.
 There was also a berth for the winner of the Roller Hockey Bundesliga (from Germany), but the champions Iserlohn also declined the invitation. The 3rd place of the Nationale 1 Elite, Dinan Quévert, were then awarded with the spot.

Round dates
The schedule of the competition is as follows (draw held in Mieres, Spain, on 10 September 2016).

Group stage

The 16 teams were allocated into four pots, with the title holders, Benfica, being placed in Pot 1 automatically. The other 3 seeded teams, Barcelona, Forte dei Marmi and Liceo, were automatically placed in groups B, C and D, respectively. They were drawn into four groups of four, with the restriction that teams from the same association could not be drawn against each other.

In each group, teams played against each other home-and-away in a home-and-away round-robin format.

A total of 5 national associations were represented in the group stage. Sporting CP made its debut appearance in the group stage.

The group winners and runners-up advanced to the quarter-finals.

Group A

Group B

Group C

Group D

Knockout phase
The knockout phase comprises a quarter-final round and the final four tournament. In the quarter-finals, group stage winners play against group stage runners-up, the latter hosting the first of two legs. The winners qualify for the final four, which will take place at the ground of one of the four finalists.

Quarter-finals
The first-leg matches were played on 11 March, and the second-leg matches were played on 1 April 2017.

|}

Final four

The final four tournament took place on 13 and 14 May 2017. It was hosted by Barcelona at the Pavelló Barris Nord in Lleida, Spain.

All times listed below are local time (UTC+02:00).

Semi-finals

Final

See also
2016–17 CERS Cup
2017 CERH Continental Cup
2016–17 CERH Women's European Cup

References

External links
Comité Européen de Rink-Hockey (official website)

Rink Hockey Euroleague
2016 in roller hockey
CERH European League